Hawthorne Race Course is a racetrack for horse racing in Stickney/Cicero, Illinois, near Chicago.

The oldest continually run family-owned racetrack in North America, in 2009 the Horseplayers Association of North America introduced a rating system for 65 Thoroughbred racetracks in North America. Of the top ten, Hawthorne was ranked No. 8.

History and information
In 1890, Edward Corrigan, a Chicago businessman and horseman who owned the 1890 Kentucky Derby winner, Riley (by Longfellow), bought  of land in Cicero and started constructing a grandstand for a new racecourse. His track opened in 1891 with a five-race card including the featured Chicago Derby. In 1902, the grandstand burned to the ground, which moved all racing to the Harlem racetrack in Chicago. The reopened track held a 12-day summer meet at its own facility later that year.

In 1905, horse racing was banned in Chicago, leading to the closure of Hawthorne. The field was used briefly by pioneer aviators Victor and Allan Haines Loughead in 1910 to fly a powered Montgomery glider and a Curtiss pusher.

In 1909, the track was sold to Thomas Carey who tried to reopen the track twice but was stopped by the sheriff's department and the local police.

In 1914, motorcycle racing was featured at the track. On June 7, 1914 Charles "Fearless" Balke, famed Motordrome board track and flat track racer, met his death by colliding with a 2 ton roller that was mistakenly ordered onto the track by the track manager, a Mr. Derkum, while Balke was doing practice laps. "Fearless" was blinded by dust and exhaust smoke from other racers who were also doing practice laps. At the time of his death Charles Balke was the top rated motorcycle racer in the United States, and was the number one rider on the top rated Hendee Manufacturing Company / Indian Motorcycle racing team. He was 23 years of age, and left behind a much loved wife, Edith "Snooks" Balke (Bradford).   

In 1916, the track ran a 13-day meeting which included the American Derby. That would be the last race until 1922.

In 1922, the track reopened legally for a 13-day race meeting. In 1923, the meet expanded again to 25 days. The Chicago Business Men's Racing Association took over racing operations in 1924 and ran a 52-day meet in the fall. This same year a new clubhouse was constructed at Hawthorne, and a form of parimutuel betting was introduced.

By 1927, the racetrack was gaining prominence on the national scene. A new starting was introduced, as was the Hawthorne Gold Cup Handicap, a major stakes event. In 1929, Sun Beau won his first Gold Cup and would later capture two more. In 1931, an electric time and an infield tote board were introduced.

The track introduced daily double wagering to Chicago and used a new infrared timer in the early 1930s. The track began the Chicago racing season in 1936 with a spring meet.

The Hawthorne continued to advance in the 1930s and 1940s, taking over the racing dates of Lincoln Fields Race Track as well as racing earlier in the spring. The track also introduced races restricted to Illinois-bred horses.

Turf racing returned to Hawthorne in 1948 with the renovation of the racing strip and the introduction of a six-furlong turf course. In 1959, a new clubhouse was opened with vastly expanded seating to serve the racing needs of the Chicago market. The track continued to thrive during the 1960s and 1970s, but it had crested in attendance and the attendance slowly began to drop.

By 1970, harness racing was held at Hawthorne in an effort to offer a product to lovers of standardbred racing. The track was awarded spring dates and ran spring, summer, and autumn thoroughbred meets and a winter standardbred meet. The track stopped in September for the Arlington Park meet and also began to hold occasional quarter horse races.

In 1978, a fire destroyed Hawthorne's grandstand. The attempt to move the meet to Sportsman's Park Racetrack failed, but in 1979 racing was moved to Sportsman's Park. In 1980 the track officially opened for a 72-day thoroughbred meet beginning at the end of September.

In 1985, Arlington Park burned to the ground and Hawthorne Race Course gained all summer dates except Arlington Million day. In 1986, 1987, and 1988 the track also held these summertime meetings.

In 2020, Hawthorne got approval to become a racino.

Physical attributes
The track has a one-mile (1.609 km) dirt oval and a seven-furlong (1.408 km) turf course. The main track's home stretch is 1,320 feet, the third longest of any dirt track in the United States — only the home stretches at Los Alamitos Race Course (1,380 feet) and Fair Grounds Race Course (1,346 feet) are longer.

However, this leads to the turns being unusually tight: On the dirt oval, the turns are just 1,136 feet long — and on the turf course, 806 feet — the tightest turns of any turf course in the United States.

TV personalities
Phil Georgeff (1959-1992)
Jim Miller (1997–present)
Mitch Demick (2007–2009)
Katie Mikolay (2006–2010)
Nancy Ury (2000–2002)
Peter Galassi (2002–present)

Racing
The track runs the following graded stakes:
Grade 3 – Hawthorne Gold Cup Handicap
Grade 3 – Illinois Derby
Grade 3 – Sixty Sails Handicap

Hawthorne also runs the ungraded Bill Hartack Memorial Handicap, which was inaugurated in 2008 and was originally called the National Jockey Club Handicap, as well as the Hawthorne Derby which carried Grade 3 status through 2017.

Chicagoland Sports Hall of Fame

References

External links
Official website

 
Horse racing venues in Illinois
Sports venues completed in 1891
1891 establishments in Illinois